Harstad Vikings was a Norwegian basketball team. The Vikings played their matches in Harstadhallen. They used to wear blue and white kits. Harstad won the BLNO championship in 2006, and made a total of 5 final appearances.

External links
Harstad Vikings Official Club Website
 Eurobasket Official webpage

Defunct basketball teams in Norway
Sport in Troms
Harstad
Basketball teams disestablished in 2009
Basketball teams established in 2000
Viking Age in popular culture